Theodore Dehon (December 8, 1776 – August 6, 1817) was the second bishop of the Episcopal Diocese of South Carolina.

Biography
Theodore Dehon was born in Boston and graduated from Harvard University in 1795. He was ordained deacon by Bishop Edward Bass in Newburyport, Massachusetts, on December 24, 1797, and the next month began his call as rector of Trinity Church, Newport, Rhode Island. He was ordained priest on October 9, 1800.

After paying a visit to South Carolina he was offered positions in Charleston, but demurred until 1810, when he accepted a position as rector of St. Michael's Church, Charleston. He was elected diocesan bishop in February 1812 and was consecrated on October 15, 1812. After the General Convention in New York City in 1817, he returned to Charleston but contracted yellow fever, dying August 6. He was buried at St. Michael's Church. His writings met with some posthumous success.

His obituary in the Essex Register of Saturday 23 August 1817 reads: "To our bill of mortality we have to add the death of the Right Reverend Theodore Dehon, D.D aged 41, Bishop of the Protestant Episcopal Church of the English Communion, in S. Carolina, on the 6th instant. This amiable man and truly Christian Bishop was born in Boston, and graduated at Cambridge in 1795. He succeeded Bishop Robert Smith, who died in 1801, but not immediately, but in 1812. To a suavity of manners, correct elocution, and a soul of devotion, he added the purity and best accomplishments of life, a just taste, and an excellent judgement, with an extensive knowledge of the duties and the studies of his profession."

Consecrators
 William White, 1st bishop of Pennsylvania and 1st and 4th Presiding Bishop
 Abraham Jarvis, 2nd bishop of Connecticut
 John Henry Hobart, Coadjutor bishop of New York

Theodore Dehon was the 11th bishop consecrated for the Episcopal Church.

References and external links
 Virtual American Biographies, edited from Appleton Encyclopedia
 Material by and about Dehon from Project Canterbury
 The Episcopal Church Annual. Morehouse Publishing: New York, NY (2005).

See also
 Succession of Bishops of the Episcopal Church in the United States

References

1776 births
1817 deaths
Deaths from yellow fever
Clergy from Boston
Clergy from Charleston, South Carolina
Harvard College alumni
Episcopal bishops of South Carolina
Infectious disease deaths in South Carolina
19th-century Anglican bishops in the United States